Ocracoke   is a census-designated place (CDP) and unincorporated town located at the southern end of Ocracoke Island, located entirely within Hyde County, North Carolina,  United States. The population was 948 as of the 2010 census. In the 2020 census, the population had dropped to 797 people.

No bridges connect Ocracoke Island to the mainland, though the main road across the island is part of North Carolina Highway 12, which uses a series of ferries to connect to Hatteras Island, to Cedar Island, and to the mainland at Swan Quarter.  The economy of the island is driven by tourism and commercial fishing.  A unique dialect of English, known colloquially as the Hoi Toider accent, is spoken in Ocracoke, though among younger residents it is being replaced by more standard dialects of General American.  Ocracoke Island was the location of the pirate Blackbeard's death in November 1718. Though it saw no direct military action, Ocracoke was the site of a Confederate fort during the U.S. Civil War as well as several naval battles that occurred off the coast of the island during World War II; the remains of British sailors killed during these engagements occupy a small cemetery on the island.

History
The Outer Banks area was occasionally visited by Algonquian-speaking Indians but was never permanently settled. Ocracoke was called Wokokkon and was used as a subsistence hunting and fishing ground for the Hatterask Indians, a Croatoan people. "Yaupon tea" or "black drink" was made from the dried leaves of the indigenous yaupon, a native holly, and was used ceremonially by the Indians in the area. Italian explorer Giovanni da Verrazzano described the area in detail in 1524. He was unable to navigate the shallow inlets leading into Pamlico Sound.

In 1585, Sir Walter Raleigh's ship the Tiger ran aground on a sand bar in Ocracoke Inlet and was forced to land on the island for repairs. English colonists attempted a settlement at Roanoke Island in the late 16th century, but it failed. This effectively halted European settlement in the area until 1663, when the Carolina Colony was chartered by King Charles II. However, remote Ocracoke Island was not permanently settled until 1750, being a pirate haven at times before then. It was a favorite anchorage of Edward Teach, better known as the pirate Blackbeard. He was killed on the island in a fierce battle with troops from Virginia on November 22, 1718. The grounds of what is now the Springer's Point Nature Preserve were said to be his hideout.

The state assembly established Pilot Town in 1715. Throughout the mid-to-late 18th century, the island was home to a number of especially skilled schooner pilots who could get smaller ships through the inlet to Pamlico Sound. As population increased on the mainland, demand increased for shipment of goods from ocean-going vessels. Warehouses were built to hold goods off-loaded from larger ships offshore and then loaded onto smaller schooners to be delivered to plantations and towns along the mainland rivers.

By the late 19th century, the shipping business was gone, and the United States Life-Saving Service became a major source of steady income for local men. Fishing became more important to the livelihood of the area, including charters for tourists.

The Ocracoke Historic District, Ocracoke Light Station, and Salter-Battle Hunting and Fishing Lodge are listed on the National Register of Historic Places. Major hurricanes struck the island in August and September 1933, September 1944, and August 1949. The first-person accounts of these storms were recorded on the walls of the "Hurricane House".

Afterwards, Ocracoke Island was closed to visitors for contractors to repair the road and dune line. Normal access was restored as of December 5, 2019.   

The island population has experienced significant and steady growth, with new business permits being issued and the construction of new housing.

Fort Ocracoke

Fort Ocracoke, a Confederate fortification constructed at the beginning of the American Civil War, was situated on Beacon Island in Ocracoke Inlet, two miles to the west-southwest of Ocracoke village. The octagon-shaped fort was built on a previous War of 1812 site. At one point nearly 500 Confederate troops were stationed in and around Ocracoke and the fort. The Confederates abandoned and partially destroyed the fort in August 1861 after Union victories on nearby Hatteras Island. Union forces razed it a month later on September 17, 1861. Beacon Island and the fort subsided beneath the waves of the inlet after the 1933 hurricanes that struck the area. The remnants of Fort Ocracoke were relocated and identified in 1998 by the Surface Interval Diving Company.

Energy modernization project 
In May 2021, Ocracoke was one of 11 communities (along with nearby Nags Head, North Carolina) chosen by the United States Department of Energy to participate in the Energy Transitions Initiative Partnership Project, a program to provide federal aid for remote communities to modernize their electric infrastructure and resiliency through natural disasters and outages. Ocracoke's grant is used to analyze the possibility of electrifying its ferry fleet. An electrified ferry fleet would increase hurricane evacuation access while decreasing reliance on fossil fuels.

Geography

The island of Ocracoke is a part of the Outer Banks of North Carolina. At various times throughout recorded history the barrier island now known as Ocracoke has been part of Hatteras Island.  The "Old Hatteras Inlet" opened prior to 1657 south of the current inlet separating Ocracoke from Hatteras, but closed around 1764 causing the islands to be reconnected. Ocracoke remained connected to Hatteras until Wells Creek Inlet opened in the 1840s and later closed.  The modern "Hatteras Inlet" that separates the two islands was formed on September 7, 1846 by a violent gale. This massive storm, known in Cuba as 1846 Havana hurricane and along the East Coast of the United States as the Great Gale of 1846, was the same storm that opened Oregon Inlet.

It is one of the most remote islands in the Outer Banks, as it can only be reached by one of three public ferries (two of which are toll ferries), private boat, or private plane. Other than the village of Ocracoke and a few other areas (a ferry terminal, a pony pen, a small runway), the entire island is part of the Cape Hatteras National Seashore.

The village of Ocracoke is located around a small sheltered harbor called Silver Lake, with a second smaller residential area built around a series of man-made canals called Oyster Creek. The village is located at the widest point of the island, protected from the Atlantic Ocean by sand dunes and a salt marsh. Flooding is a risk during both hurricanes and large storms. Ocracoke Light is situated near Silver Lake and has remained in continuous operation since 1823.

The island is home to a British cemetery. During World War II, German submarines sank several British ships, including , and the bodies of British sailors were washed ashore. They were buried in a cemetery on the island. A lease for the  plot, where a British flag flies at all times, was given to the Commonwealth War Graves Commission for as long as the land remained a cemetery, and the small site officially became a British cemetery. The United States Coast Guard station on Ocracoke Island takes care of the property. A memorial ceremony is held each year in May.

Ocracoke village is located at  (35.112687, -75.975895).

Climate
Ocracoke has a humid subtropical climate (Cfa) with hot, humid summers and cool, windy winters. Precipitation is plentiful year round and peaks during the months of August and September. The highest daily snow depth also occurred on January 24, 2003 and was nine inches, with the snow sticking on the ground for five days in total. The first and last average dates for a freeze are December 21 and March 3, giving Ocracoke an average growing season of 293 days. The average first and last dates for a hot  temperature are May 9 and October 16. The ocean is usually comfortable for swimming from late May into early October.

Transportation and public services
A single paved two-lane road, NC 12, runs from the village at the southwestern end of the island to the ferry dock at the northeastern tip of the island, where a one-hour-long free ferry connects to Hatteras Island. The second ferry dock, located in the village, has toll connections to Swans Quarter, on the mainland and Cedar Island, near Atlantic.A passenger ferry operates across Ocracoke Inlet to the deserted village of Portsmouth, at the northern end of the Core Banks.

Ocracoke Island Airport (FAA Identifier W95) is located slightly southeast of the village, allowing small aircraft to land.

This is possibly a consideration against building a bridge to this island.

The lengthy travel time between Ocracoke and other portions of Hyde County meant that, according to David S. Cecelski, author of Along Freedom Road: Hyde County, North Carolina, and the Fate of Black Schools in the South, that "Ocracokers have had little interaction with the rest of Hyde County".

Hyde County maintains the Ocracoke Volunteer Fire Department located on Highway 12.

Economy

Tourism

The economy of Ocracoke Island is based almost entirely on tourism. During the winter, the population shrinks and only a few businesses remain open. During the spring, summer, and early fall, an influx of tourists occupies hotels, campgrounds and weekly rental houses—and day visitors arrive by ferry from Hatteras Island. Several bars, a brewery, dozens of restaurants, and many shops, stores and other tourist-based businesses open for the tourist season. Visitors can find many shops that feature local, handmade goods, as well as imported artisanal goods and rare antiques, unusual for such a small island.

Fishing

Commercial fishing contributes to the local economy with chartered sport fishing drawing tourism. With easy access to Pamlico Sound, the Atlantic coast and the Gulf Stream, Ocracoke offers various fishing opportunities, from small Sound fish to tuna and drum.

World records
On November 4, 1987, the world record  Spanish mackerel was caught on a boat owned by Woody Outlaw off Ocracoke. The fish that set this world record exceeded the previous record by almost 20%.

Winter economy
During the winter, the island's only main employers are construction, the NC Department of Transportation, and the businesses that support the small population. Many islanders use the winter as time off, since they tend to work between 60 and 80 hours a week during the tourist season.

Local dialect
Ocracoke Island and other parts of the Outer Banks historically have a distinct dialect of English, often referred to as a brogue. The dialect is known as the High Tider dialect, after the characteristic phrase "high tide" (often pronounced "hoi toide"). Due to the influx of tourists and greater contact with the mainland in recent years, however, the brogue has been increasingly influenced by outside dialects.

Demographics

2020 census

As of the 2020 United States census, there were 797 people, 317 households, and 225 families residing in the CDP.

2010 census
As of 2010, there were 948 people living in the CDP. The population density as of 2000 was 80.4 people per square mile (31.1/km). In 2000, there were 784 housing units at an average density of 82.0/sq mi (31.7/km) in 2000. As of 2010, the racial makeup of the CDP was 96.2% White, 1.6% African American, 0.6% from two or more races, 0.4% from Native American, and 0.2% Asian. Hispanic or Latino of any race were 19.1% of the population.

There were 370 households, out of which 17.6% had children under the age of 18 living with them, 46.8% were married couples living together, 8.9% had a female householder with no husband present, and 40.8% were non-families. 30.8% of all households were composed of individuals, and 8.9% had someone living alone who was 65 years of age or older. The average household size was 2.08 and the average family size was 2.55.

In the CDP, the population was spread out, with 13.0% under the age of 18, 6.1% from 18 to 24, 28.3% from 25 to 44, 34.6% from 45 to 64, and 17.9% who were 65 years of age or older. The median age was 46 years. For every 100 females, there were 96.2 males. For every 100 females age 18 and over, there were 89.0 males.

The median income for a household in the CDP was $34,315, and the median income for a family was $38,750. Males had a median income of $26,667 versus $25,625 for females. The per capita income for the CDP was $18,032. About 7.7% of families and 9.3% of the population were below the poverty line, including 13.8% of those under age 18 and 10.4% of those age 65 or over.

Education
The residents of Ocracoke Island are served by the Ocracoke School (K-12), part of the Hyde County Schools, with a student population of 186 as of 2019. BHM Regional Library operates a library branch within the Ocracoke School and Community Library.

Culture
In Ocracoke, figs and fig cake are a prominent part of the town's cuisine, and the town has an annual fig festival that includes a fig cake contest.

Ocracoke is home to one radio station, WOVV.  The studios of WOVV, branded as "Ocracoke Community Radio", are located on Back Road in Ocracoke.

The Ocracoke Observer newspaper provides coverage of local and regional events. The Observer website is updated daily and a monthly print edition is produced March through December.

In popular culture 
 Ocracoke is the setting for the bestselling A Holiday for Edith and the Bears in the Lonely Doll series by Dare Wright
 Ocracoke appears in the novel A Breath of Snow and Ashes by Diana Gabaldon
 Most of the setting in the novel The Wish by Nicholas Sparks takes place in Ocracoke

References

External links

 Cape Hatteras National Seashore - Ocracoke Island
 Clips from The Ocracoke Brogue documentary
 Preliminary Site Sketch, Fort Ocracoke

Census-designated places in Hyde County, North Carolina
Islands of North Carolina
Census-designated places in North Carolina
Beaches of North Carolina
Outer Banks
Populated places established in 1750
Cape Hatteras National Seashore
Landforms of Hyde County, North Carolina
Historic Albemarle Tour
Populated coastal places in North Carolina